Crocanthes symmochlopa is a moth in the family Lecithoceridae. It was described by Edward Meyrick in 1929. It is found on New Ireland in Papua New Guinea.

The forewings are deep reddish orange with the veins marked with irregular black lines or streaks not reaching the margins, on the basal two-fifths merged in a broad irregular black median streak, connected on the end of the cell by a black bar, and terminated posteriorly by a nearly straight transverse black streak from the costa at four-fifths nearly or quite reaching the dorsum before the tornus. There is a slender black marginal streak around the apex and termen. The hindwings are deep reddish orange, the veins marked with irregular black lines. There is an oblique black bar on the end of the cell and three rounded black blotches occupy the upper half of the termen (above the proflexus), the two upper ones sometimes confluent near the margin.

References

Moths described in 1929
Crocanthes